Short Grass is a 1950 American Western film directed by Lesley Selander and starring Rod Cameron, Cathy Downs and Johnny Mack Brown.

Cast
 Rod Cameron as Steve Llewellyn 
 Cathy Downs as Sharon Lynch 
 Johnny Mack Brown as Sheriff Ord Keown 
 Raymond Walburn as Doctor McKenna 
 Alan Hale Jr. as Chris Christofferson 
 Morris Ankrum as Hal Fenton 
 Jonathan Hale as Charlie Bissel 
 Harry Woods as Sam Dreen 
 Marlo Dwyer as Jennie Westfall 
 Riley Hill as Randee Fenton 
 Jeff York as Curley 
 Stanley Andrews as Pete Lynch 
 Jack Ingram as Jack 
 Myron Healey as Les McCambridge 
 Tristram Coffin as John Devore 
 Rory Mallinson as Jim Westfall 
 Felipe Turich as Manuel 
 George J. Lewis as Diego 
 Lee Tung Foo as Lin

References

Bibliography
 Pitts, Michael R. Western Movies: A Guide to 5,105 Feature Films. McFarland, 2012.

External links
 

1950 films
1950 Western (genre) films
1950s English-language films
American Western (genre) films
Films directed by Lesley Selander
Allied Artists films
American black-and-white films
1950s American films